Bilboa is a settlement located on the boundaries of counties Carlow, Laois and Kilkenny in Ireland. A bridge, a short distance from the village and built , is known as the 'Three Counties Bridge'.

The little settlement at Bilboa was originally based around coal and coal mining. Of the original mining village, only the church remains. Bilboá's Church of Ireland church is a detached three-bay Tudor Revival church, built in 1846. It has a crenellated entrance tower and granite dressings including clasping buttresses on octagonal plans. The interior retains its original pews.

The origins of the name Bilboa are reputedly recorded in several small extracts on the organ of the village. The passages were taken from the old school house in the village (now a shop). The general story suggests that a Colonel John Staunton Rochford (1802-1844) returned from fighting in the British army in the Napoleonic Wars. He was credited with some act of valour while fighting around the Spanish city of Bilboa. Hence he became known as Rochford of Bilboa, where as his family before him where the Rochfords of Clogrennene. Later members of his family were involved in the building of Bilboa church . Since then, the area has been known as Bilboa.

The area is home to a windfarm, a national (primary) school and an An Post post office.

References

 

Towns and villages in County Carlow